Moore is an unincorporated community and census-designated place (CDP) in Frio County, Texas, United States. Its population was 475 at the 2010 census.

Geography
Moore is located in northeastern Frio County at  (29.065636, -99.013345). Interstate 35 passes through the community, with access from Exit 114. I-35 leads northeast  to downtown San Antonio and southwest  to Pearsall, the Frio County seat.

All of the CDP area is land.

Demographics

As of the census of 2020,  279 people lived in the Moore CDP. The population density was 20.6 people per square mile (8.0/km2). The 283 housing units averaged 9.1/sq mi (3.5/km2). The racial makeup of the CDP was 85.09% White, 0.47% African American, 1.40% Native American, 0.31% Pacific Islander, 10.09% from other races, and 2.64% from two or more races. Hispanics or Latinos of any race were 46.27% of the population.

Of the 248 households,  29.8% had children under the age of 18 living with them, 55.6% were married couples living together, 10.9% had a female householder with no husband present, and 26.6% were not families. About 23.4% of all households were made up of individuals, and 9.7% had someone living alone who was 65 years of age or older. The average household size was 2.56, and the average family size was 3.02.

In the CDP, the age distribution was 25.6% under 18, 4.5% from 18 to 24, 25.8% from 25 to 44, 27.0% from 45 to 64, and 17.1% who were 65 or older. The median age was 40 years. For every 100 females, there were 107.1 males. For every 100 females age 18 and over, there were 100.4 males.

The median income for a household in the CDP was $39,063, and for a family was $40,774. Males had a median income of $24,531 versus $28,281 for females. The per capita income for the CDP was $15,975. About 9.9% of families and 15.4% of the population were below the poverty line, including 19.2% of those under age 18 and 12.2% of those age 65 or over.

Education
Moore is served by the Pearsall Independent School District.

References

Census-designated places in Frio County, Texas
Census-designated places in Texas
Unincorporated communities in Frio County, Texas
Unincorporated communities in Texas